Henry Frederick Thynne may refer to 

Sir Henry Frederick Thynne, 1st Baronet  (1615–1680), of Cause Castle
Henry Frederick Carteret, 1st Baron Carteret (1735–1826), previously Thynne, English member of parliament and Master of the Household to King George III
Lord Henry Frederick Thynne (1832–1904), member of parliament and Treasurer of the Household  to Queen Victoria
Henry Frederick Thynne, 3rd Marquess of Bath (1797–1837), naval commander and landowner 
Henry Frederick Thynne, 6th Marquess of Bath (1905–1992), member of parliament and landowner

See also
Henry Frederick, Prince of Wales (1594–1612)